The Colombia women's national futsal team represents Colombia in international women's futsal competitions. It is overseen by the Colombian Football Federation in FIFA competitions and by the Fecolfutsal in AMF competitions.

Competitive record 
*Draws include knockout matches decided on penalty kicks.
**Gold background colour indicates that the tournament was won.
***Red border colour indicates tournament was held on home soil.

 Champions   Runners-up  Third Place   Fourth place

AMF

Futsal Women's World Cup

FIFA

Women's Futsal World Tournament

South American Women's Futsal Championship

Results and fixtures

FIFA

2017

Colombia women's national under-20 futsal team 
The Colombia women's national under-20 futsal team will participate in FIFA' South American Women's Under-20 Futsal Championship for its first edition in 2016.

South American Women's Under-20 Futsal Championship 
*Draws include knockout matches decided on penalty kicks.
**Gold background colour indicates that the tournament was won.
***Red border colour indicates tournament was held on home soil.

 Champions   Runners-up  Third Place   Fourth place

Honours

CONMEBOL
South American Women's Futsal Championship:
 Champions (1): 2015
 Runners-up (3): 2007, 2009, 2017
South American Games:
 Champions (1): 2018 Cochabamba

AMF
AMF Futsal Women's World Cup:
 Champions (2): 2013, 2022
 Third place (2): 2008, 2017

See also
Colombia national futsal team

References

External links
 FIFA
 CONMEBOL

Colombia
futsal
Futsal in Colombia
Women's football in Colombia
2007 establishments in Colombia